Hot Stuff may refer to:

Film
 Hot Stuff (1929 film), a 1929 film starring Alice White, Louise Fazenda, and William Bakewell
 Hot Stuff (1956 film), a 1956 short subject starring the Three Stooges
 Hot Stuff (1971 film), a 1971 National Film Board of Canada animated short
 Hot Stuff (1979 film), a 1979 film starring Dom DeLuise, Suzanne Pleshette, and Jerry Reed

Music 
 Hot Stuff (album), a 1984 album by La Mafia
 Hot Stuff, a 1988 album by Buck Clarke
 "Hot Stuff (Let's Dance)", a 2007 song by Craig David from Trust Me
 "Hot Stuff" (Donna Summer song), a 1979 song from Bad Girls
 "Hot Stuff" (Rolling Stones song) from Black and Blue
 "Hot Stuff" (Kumi Koda song), Kumi Koda's 15th domestic single
 "Hot Stuff", a song by Ashlee Simpson from Bittersweet World
 "Hot Stuff", a song by Whitesnake from Come an' Get It
 "Hot Stuff", a song by Krokus from The Blitz
 "Hot Stuff", a song by Davichi from My Fair Lady

Other uses
 Eddie Gilbert (wrestler) (1961–1995), American wrestler known as "Hot Stuff" Eddie Gilbert
 "Hot Stuff",  the 159th episode of Happy Days where the original Arnold's was burned down
 Hot Stuff (aircraft), American aircraft during World War II
 Hot Stuff the Little Devil, a Harvey Comics character
 "Hot Stuff", the 94th episode of Family Matters